was a town located in Kaifu District, Tokushima Prefecture, Japan.

As of 2003, the town had an estimated population of 3,550 and a density of 38.59 persons per km². The total area was 92.00 km².

On March 31, 2006, Shishikui, along with the towns of Kaifu and Kainan (all from Kaifu District), was merged to create the town of Kaiyō.

External links
 Kaiyō official website (in Japanese)

Dissolved municipalities of Tokushima Prefecture
Kaiyō, Tokushima